Aliabad (also Romanized as ‘Alīābād; also known as ‘Alīābād-e Chāhjangīkhān) is a village in Jolgeh-ye Chah Hashem Rural District, Jolgeh-ye Chah Hashem District, Dalgan County, Sistan and Baluchestan Province, Iran. At the 2006 census, its population was 262, in 56 families.

References 

Populated places in Dalgan County